The U.S. state of Louisiana first required its residents to register their motor vehicles and display license plates in 1915. , plates are issued by the Public Safety Services division of the Louisiana Department of Public Safety & Corrections, through its Office of Motor Vehicles. Only rear plates have been required since 1952.

Passenger baseplates

1915 to 1963
The 1954 (dated 1955) issue was the first Louisiana license plate that complied with these standards.

1964 to present

Non-passenger plates

Optional plates
Optional plates do not use leading zeros in their serials.

Government plates

State Police troop codes
From 1964 until 1993, Louisiana State Police troop area codes were used as part of the serial on the plate, invariably in the center of the serial. From 1993 until 1996, stickers were used to show the troop. This was done to give some idea of where the plates were issued. However, registrants who applied via the mail got plates with the "X" code, which was used for Baton Rouge.

References

External links
Louisiana license plates, 1969–present
Louisiana License Plates

Louisiana
Transportation in Louisiana
Louisiana transportation-related lists